Tingzhou fu was a prefecture in Fujian province from the Tang Dynasty down to the early 20th century, when it was renamed .

History

As early as 3,000 to 4,000 years ago, the She people thrived along the Tingjiang river(), which originates in the north and runs through the county toward the south, and enters the South China Sea in Shantou(), Guangdong() province. Since early history, the Tingjiang river has been serving as an important water path for travel and, more importantly, the shipping of goods between coastal areas and mountainous terrain. It was said that the early Hakka ancestors traveled from north through the same path to Guangdong and the other parts of China and overseas, so Tingjiang river also gained its name as "Hakka's Mother River".

Imperial
During the Han Dynasty, county-level administration was established where Changting county is currently seated. To take on immigrating northerners, the Tingzhou fu prefecture administration was set up in the 24th reign-year of the Tang emperor Kaiyuan, i.e. 736 CE.

Since then and until the end of Qing Dynasty(), Changting had been where Zhou(), Jun(), Lu() and Fu() (all prefectural level administrations) were located, and economic and political center of western Fujian(). During the Ming and Qing dynasties, Tingzhou Fu encompassed eight counties including Changting (长汀), Ninghua (宁化), often regarded as very first settlement place for Hakka people), Qingliu (清流), Guihua (归化, obsolete), Liancheng (连城), Shanghang (上杭), Wuping (武平) and Yongding (永定). Being the first such territory set up by administration for migrant resettlement and one of the main concentration places for Hakka people, Tingzhou vies with Meixian (Mei County) in nearby eastern Guangdong in being referred to as the "Capital of the Hakkas"(). Today many Hakkas can trace their origins back to Tingzhou.

Revolution Era

Tingzhou was renamed "Changting" in the 2nd year of the Republic of China, i.e. 1913 (Year Two of the Chinese Republic). During Chinese Civil War, the prefecture was the economic and financial centre of the Chinese Soviet Republic. Tens of thousands of people from "Changting" joined the Chinese Red Army - but not many survived the Long March.

With the founding of the People's Republic of China, the Prefecture was renamed again ("Longyan" 龙岩地区) and—minus several counties—its political center was relocated to Xinluo.

The former prefecture seat --"Tingzhou Town" (汀州镇)—now only a shiretown (or "county-town", 县城), commemorates the imperial-era prefecture. The name of its reduced purview --Changting (长汀)—recalls the prefecture in its ROC years.

Real reorganisation only came in the early years of the People's Republic (1949-- ), which established a Diqu (地区, "region") --since upgraded to the Diji Shi (地级市, "prefecture-level city")-- called Longyan. Two counties of the Imperial- and Republican eras, Ninghua and Qingliu, were detached. The remaining seven have henceforth been administered from a new centre, Xinluo (新罗), which is more accessible to the province's heavily populated coast.

Note on Usage
By Chinese convention the prefectural name would also refer, depending on context, to the city which was the seat of its government. Thus Mao Zedong's Red Army column is said to have taken Changting in 1929, meaning that his column exercised real control over what is now Tingzhou town.

Notable individuals from Changting
 Yang Chengwu, 1914-2004 Revolutionarian and General of People's Liberation Army 
 Chen Pixian, 1916-1995  Revolutionarian and CPC official
 Fu Lianzhang, 1894-1968 Christian, practitioner of western medicine, Long March veteran, PRC Health Ministry official and Cultural Revolution victim.

Notes and references

External links
http://www.changting.gov.cn

Former prefectures in Fujian
Prefectures of the Tang dynasty
Prefectures of the Ming dynasty
Prefectures of the Qing dynasty
Prefectures of the Song dynasty
History of Fujian
Prefecture-level divisions of Fujian